is a masculine Japanese given name which was popular during the Shōwa period.

Possible writings
Isao can be written using different kanji characters and can mean:
功, "achievement"
勲, "meritorious"
績, "exploits"
公, "public"
勇男, "brave, man"
勇夫, "brave, man"
勇雄, "brave, masculine"
伊佐夫
伊佐雄
伊三男
The name can also be written in hiragana or katakana.

People with the name
, Japanese hammer thrower
Isao Aoki (功, born 1942), Japanese professional golfer
, Japanese ice hockey player
Isao Harimoto (勲, born 1940), Zainichi Korean professional baseball player
Isao Hashizume (功, born 1941), Japanese actor
, Japanese singer and composer
Isao Homma (born 1981), Japanese footballer who plays for Albirex Niigata
Isao Inokuma (功, 1938–2001), Japanese judoka
Isao Iwabuchi (born 1933), Japanese Olympic football player
, Japanese ice hockey player
, Japanese ice hockey player
Isao Kikuchi (born 1921), American graphic designer, painter, carver, illustrator
Isao Kimura (功, 1923–1981), Japanese actor
Isao Kubota (born 1983), Japanese footballer who plays for Samut Songkhram
, Japanese actor
Isao Matsumiya, Japanese politician
Isao Matsuoka (功, born 1934), Chairman of Toho
, Japanese motorcycle racer
, Japanese swimmer
Isao Nakauchi (功, 1922–2005), founder of Daiei
Isao Obata (1904–1976), pioneering Japanese master of Shotokan karate
Isao Okano (功, born 1944), Japanese judoka
Isao Okawa (功, 1926–2001), former Chairman of Sega
Isao Okazaki (功, 1920–2006), Japanese right-wing activist
, Japanese ice hockey player
Isao Sasaki, (功, Japanese anime singer, actor, and voice actor
Isao Shinohara, (篠原 功), Japanese voice actor
, Japanese professional wrestler
Isao Takahata (勲, 1935–2018), Japanese anime director
Isao Tamagawa (伊佐男, 1922–2004), Japanese actor
Isao Tomita (勲, born 1932), Japanese electronic music composer
, Japanese film director
Isao Yamagata (1915–1996), Japanese film actor (fl. 1951 and 1984)
, Japanese diver
Isao Yoneda (功, born 1977), Japanese gymnast
Isao Yukisada (勲, born 1968), Japanese film director

Fictional characters
Isao, a character in the manga series How to Keep a Mummy
Isao Iinuma, protagonist of the novel Runaway Horses
Isao Ohta (功), a character in the anime and manga series Mobile Police Patlabor
Kondo Isao, a character in the anime and manga series Gin Tama

Japanese masculine given names